Salvatore Peter Tripoli, also known as Jackie Williams (December 5, 1904 – March 7, 1990) was an American bantamweight professional boxer who competed in the 1920s. He won a silver medal for the United States at the 1924 Summer Olympics in Paris, France.

1924 Olympic results
Below is the record of Salvatore Tripoli, an American bantamweight boxer who competed at the 1924 Paris Olympics:

 Round of 32: defeated Carlos Usaveaga (Chile) on points
 Round of 16: defeated Les Tarrant (Great Britain) on points
 Quarterfinal: defeated Benjamin Pertuzzo (Argentina) on points
 Semifinal: defeated Oscar Andren (Sweden) on points
 Final: lost to William H. Smith (South Africa) on points (was awarded silver medal)

References

1904 births
1990 deaths
Bantamweight boxers
Boxers at the 1924 Summer Olympics
Olympic boxers of the United States
Olympic silver medalists for the United States in boxing
Place of birth missing
American male boxers
Medalists at the 1924 Summer Olympics